12 teams from Bosnia and Herzegovina, Croatia, Israel, Slovenia, and FR Yugoslavia participated in Goodyear League in its second season: Union Olimpija, Krka, Pivovarna Laško, Cibona VIP, Zadar, Zagreb, Split Croatia Osiguranje, FEAL Široki, Bosna ASA, Borac Nektar, Maccabi Tel Aviv, and Crvena zvezda.

There were 22 rounds played in the regular part of the season, best four teams qualified for the Final Four Tournament which was played in Ljubljana since April 3 until April 5, 2003. According to the original plan the Final Tournament was to be played in Tel Aviv, but due to the deteriorating security situation there at that time, the tournament got moved to Ljubljana. Crvena Zvezda finished top of the table in regular season, although the club didn't play its last round match against Maccabi, since the Israeli club didn't travel to Belgrade due to the state of emergency proclaimed following the March 2003 assassination of Serbian prime minister Zoran Đinđić. ABA awarded the game to Crvena Zvezda. In first match in Tel Aviv Crvena Zvezda defeated Maccabi.

Zadar became the 2003 Goodyear League champion.

Regular season

Final four
Matches played at Hala Tivoli, Ljubljana

Stats leaders

Ranking MVP

Points

Rebounds

Assists
{| class="wikitable" style="text-align: center;"
|-
!Rank
!width="175"|Name
!width="120"|Team
!width="60"|Assists
!width="60"|Games
!width="60"|APG
|-
|1.||align="left"| Ivan Tomas||align="left"| Zagreb||128||22||5.82
|-
|2.||align="left"| Marko Popović ||align="left"| Zadar||104||22||4.73
|-
|3.||align="left"| Dragan Aleksić ||align="left"| Borac Nektar||89||19||4.68
|-
|4.||align="left"| Mladen Erjavec||align="left"| Zadar||106||23||4.61
|-
|5.||align="left"| Scoonie Penn||align="left"| Crvena zvezda||88||22||4.00
|-

References

External links

2002–03
2002–03 in European basketball leagues
2002–03 in Serbian basketball
2002–03 in Slovenian basketball
2002–03 in Croatian basketball
2002–03 in Bosnia and Herzegovina basketball
2002–03 in Israeli basketball